Thomas Stuart Pederson (born January 14, 1970) is an American former professional ice hockey defenseman who played five seasons in the National Hockey League with the San Jose Sharks and Toronto Maple Leafs between 1992–93 and 1996–97. Pederson played one season in Japan for Seibu Tetsudo Tokyo between playing for the Sharks and the Maple Leafs. He retired in 2000 after playing two season for the Hannover Scorpions in Germany's Deutsche Eishockey Liga

Pederson was drafted 217th overall by the Minnesota North Stars in the 1989 NHL Entry Draft. He played 240 career NHL games, scoring 20 goals and 49 assists for 69 points.

He later created the Green Biscuit, an off-ice stick handling and passing aid which stays flat on nearly any surface.

Career statistics

External links
 
  Green Biscuit web site

References

1970 births
American men's ice hockey defensemen
Fort Wayne Komets players
Hannover Scorpions players
Ice hockey players from Minnesota
Sportspeople from Bloomington, Minnesota
Kansas City Blades players
Living people
Minnesota Golden Gophers men's ice hockey players
Minnesota North Stars draft picks
St. John's Maple Leafs players
San Jose Sharks players
Toronto Maple Leafs players
Utah Grizzlies (IHL) players